Triprocris is a genus of moths of the family Zygaenidae.

Species
 Triprocris smithsoniana (Clemens, 1860)
 Triprocris yampai Barnes, 1905

References
 Triprocris at funet.fi

Procridinae
Zygaenidae genera